This is a List of notable juju musicians in Nigeria

There are numerous genres of music in Nigeria. Some genres such as Jùjú music, Fuji music, Apala and Were music are peculiar to certain ethnic groups.

A
Ayinde Bakare

D
Dele Ojo

E
Ebenezer Obey

I
I. K. Dairo

K
Kokoro
King Sunny Adé

M
Moses Olaiya (Baba Sala)

P
Prince Adekunle

S
Segun Adewale
Shina Peters
Sonny Okosun

T
Tunde King
Tunde Nightingale

See also
List of Nigerian highlife musicians

References

Yoruba musicians
Nigerian composers
Lists of Nigerian musicians